is a Japanese former swimmer. He competed in two events at the 1976 Summer Olympics.

References

External links
 

1959 births
Living people
Japanese male butterfly swimmers
Olympic swimmers of Japan
Swimmers at the 1976 Summer Olympics
Sportspeople from Hiroshima
Asian Games medalists in swimming
Asian Games gold medalists for Japan
Swimmers at the 1978 Asian Games
Medalists at the 1978 Asian Games
20th-century Japanese people
21st-century Japanese people